MacKichan is a surname. Notable people with the surname include:

Blair MacKichan, English actor, musician and songwriter
Clare MacKichan, American automotive engineer and designer and GM executive
Doon MacKichan, English comedian
Steve McKichan, retired Canadian ice hockey goalkeeper